The 1992–93 season of the Norwegian Premier League, the highest bandy league for men in Norway.

Ten games were played, with 2 points given for wins and 1 for draws. Stabæk won the league. Ready was relegated, whereas Røa survived a relegation playoff.

League table

References

Seasons in Norwegian bandy
1992 in bandy
1993 in bandy
Band
Band